Skalleluia!, also called The Insyderz Present Skalleluia!, is the second album by the Christian third-wave ska band, The Insyderz. Released 5 May 1998, it is the first of their albums dedicated to ska renditions of worship songs. The album was an unexpected success for the band, which had been reluctant to record an album of praise and worship music despite their own background with the genre.

The album charted on Billboards "Hot 200", "Heatseekers", and "Top Contemporary Christian" charts at 200, 15, and 8 respectively. Their cover of Rich Mullins' song "Awesome God" won the band a Dove Award for "Hard Music Recorded Song Of The Year" in 1999.

Track listing

Personnel
Joe Yerke - Lead Vocals
Kyle Wasil - Lead Guitar
Nate Sjogren - Drums
Beau McCarthy - Bass Guitar
Bram Roberts - Trumpet
Mike Rowland - Trombone

References

The Insyderz albums
1998 albums